Julie Speidel (born 1941 in Seattle) is a sculptor from Seattle, Washington. She is the daughter of author Bill Speidel and stepdaughter of oceanographer Robert S. Dietz. She is also part owner of the Seattle Underground tours company, Bill Speidel Enterprises.

Speidel was raised in the Eastside cities of Bellevue and Hunts Point, Washington before moving to Europe when she was 12 years old.  She attended boarding schools in Sussex, then returned to America and studied at the University of Washington and Cornish School of the Arts. She operated a jewelry-making business, making items in copper and other materials, before becoming a sculptor. Her public sculptures are displayed at William Kenzo Nakamura United States Courthouse in Seattle, United States embassies, and other locations.

She has been described as the "greatest living woman Northwest sculptor." She is largely self-taught, though she credits George Tsutakawa for teaching per patination formulations and technique.

, she had a studio on Vashon Island.

To commemorate the 25th anniversary of the creation of the Bloedel Reserve on Bainbridge Island, fourteen geometric outdoor sculptures created by Speidel were placed there in 2013, the first artworks at the location. In late 2014, seven of Speidel's outdoor sculptures evoking glacial erratics, collectively titled Erratic Repose, were installed at the Tacoma Art Museum.

References

Further reading

External links

Documentary film on Vimeo

Living people
1941 births
Artists from Seattle
20th-century American sculptors
Sculptors from Washington (state)
University of Washington alumni
Cornish College of the Arts alumni
People from Vashon, Washington
People from Bellevue, Washington
People from Hunts Point, Washington